Bijoy Jain (born 1965) is an Indian architect and Norman R. Foster Visiting Professor of architecture at Yale University. He received his M. Arch from Washington University in St Louis, USA in 1990. He then worked in Richard Meier office at Los Angeles and London between 1989 and 1995. He returned to India in 1995 and founded his own firm Studio Mumbai. His works have been presented in many venues including the Alvar Aalto Symposium, the Architectural League of New York and the Canadian Centre for Architecture, which holds several of his project archives. He was also a finalist in the Agha Khan Awards 2010 Cycle.

In 2015, Jain's work was featured alongside Umberto Riva's in the exhibition Rooms You May Have Missed at the Canadian Centre for Architecture. His works are present in many international locations.

Awards
Global Award for Sustainable Architecture from L’Institut Francais D’Architecture, 2009
Design for Asia Award from the Hong Kong Design Center, 2009
Third BSI Swiss Architectural Award, Switzerland (2012)

Personal life
Bijoy Jain was in a relationship with supermodel Lakshmi Menon.

References

External links 
Official website

Finding aid for the Bijoy Jain fonds at the Canadian Centre for Architecture (Digitized items)

Sam Fox School of Design & Visual Arts alumni
Artists from Mumbai
1965 births
Living people
20th-century Indian architects
Yale University faculty
Washington University in St. Louis alumni